Dead Again is the sixth studio album by Danish heavy metal band Mercyful Fate, released in 1998 by Metal Blade Records. It marks the first album from Mercyful Fate that Michael Denner is not present on. It also marked a new era for the band, as the production is more muddy and raw, and the guitar tone is more distorted than on the three previous albums. In addition, the album introduced a more complex and arguably progressive sound to several of its tracks.

Track listing

Personnel 
Mercyful Fate
King Diamond – vocals, mixing, mastering
Hank Shermann – guitars
Mike Wead – guitars
Sharlee D'Angelo – bass
Bjarne T. Holm – drums

Production
Sterling Winfield – producer, engineer, mixing
Kol Marshall – engineer
Chris Estes – assistant engineer

References 

Dead Again
Albums with cover art by Kristian Wåhlin
1998 albums
Metal Blade Records albums